Crozer may refer to:

People 
Elizabeth Warder Crozer Campbell (1893–1971), American archeologist
John Price Crozer (1793–1866), American textile manufacturer, banker, and philanthropist
Mark Crozer, English musician

Places 
Crozer Arboretum, arboretum and garden park in Upland, Pennsylvania
Crozer-Chester Medical Center
Crozer Theological Seminary, religious institution in Upland, Pennsylvania

Other uses 
Crozer-Keystone Health System, a four-hospital health system